Bailing may refer to:

Bailing (boardsports), process of falling off a board
Bailing (boats), the removal of water from a vessel
Bailing Sport Park, in Shilin District, Taipei, Taiwan
Bailing, Jiangxi, a town in Jiangxi, China
Bailing, Wulipu, Shayang, Jingmen, Hubei